Jeff Angell (born Jefferson Alan Angell, nicknamed "Junior" and "JdoubleA", on February 13, 1973, in Tacoma, Washington) is an American musician, best known for his songwriting, lead vocals and guitar playing in the Seattle, Washington bands Post Stardom Depression, The Missionary Position and Walking Papers.

Recording career
 Sedated Souls – A local Tacoma band
 Prayer Factory – 1990s band with Jeff Angell, Darren Hocker, Danny Allen and Jeff Bernstein.
 Broadcast Amphetamine – Same members as Prayer Factory, songs such as "16 On Center", and "Summertime Radio"

Post Stardom Depression
Angell formed Post Stardom Depression with The Lemons bass player Brent Saunders, guitarist Kyong Kim and drummer Joshua Fant. On the strength of their demos and a homemade video for the song "Honeymoon Killer" Post Stardom Depression was signed to Will Records. They recorded Sexual Uno and supported its release by touring with Queens of the Stone Age, and the late Dee Dee Ramone. After fulfilling their contract with Will Records, Post Stardom Depression signed with Interscope Records.  Shortly afterward, Interscope Records absorbed Geffen Records and A&M records with UMG's acquisition of Polygram.  These complicated business matters led the band to sign with The Control Group in 2003.  Here they recorded Ordinary Miracles with producer Jack Endino. The record became a local favorite on both KEXP and KNDD. Post Stardom Depression toured to South by Southwest and played shows with The Makers, The Black Halos, The Bell Rays, and Nebula in support of the release.

Post Stardom Depression then recorded Prime Time Looks a Lot Like Amateur Night with Producer Isaac Carpenter. The record was well received critically and received strong airplay locally. The band did a few short tours but the band members felt they weren't moving forward creatively. They disbanded in 2008 after two sell-out shows at Tacoma's Hell's Kitchen club.

The Missionary Position

Following the disbandment of Post Stardom Depression, Angell formed The Missionary Position with Benjamin Anderson, an old friend. When Jeff Angell and Benjamin Anderson began playing a Thursday night residency at a club in Seattle, Washington, they hadn't yet settled on a name. Those Thursday lounge nights were billed as The Missionary Position.  Angell said "People thought that was the band's name, so, rather than fight it we embraced it" and the band became The Missionary Position.

In 2009 they recorded Diamonds in a Dead Sky and released it on the band's label "The Boredom Killing Business". The band supported the release by touring nationally.

The Song "Let's Start A Fire" was used for the Independent Film Channel's promotional campaign for its series Indie Screams.

In 2012, The Missionary Position released Consequences.

Walking Papers
In 2012 Angell recorded an album with Barrett Martin (Screaming Trees, Mad Season). The album also features songs with Duff McKagan (Guns N' Roses, Velvet Revolver, Loaded), and Pearl Jam's Mike McCready. The new line-up, called Walking Papers, released their eponymous album with Sunyata Records August 6, 2013.

Other work
Angell wrote two songs, "Elekt" and "Rock and Roll Teenage Desperation", with the band Loudermilk for their DreamWorks release The Red Record.

Discography

References
 Walking Papers article on Loudwire.com
 Walking Papers article on Guerrillacandy.com
 Walking Papers article on Blindedbysound.com
 Post Stardom Depression article on Weeklyvolcano.com
 The Missionary Position article on Blindedbysound.com
 The Missionary Position Bio
 The Missionary Position article at Boise Weekly
 The Control Group
 Ordinary Miracles credits on Allmusic.com
 Prime Time Looks A Lot Like Amateur Night credits on Allmusic.com
 Diamonds In A Dead Sky credits on Allmusic.com
 Walking Papers credits
 Loudermilk "The Red Record" credits Allmusic.com
 Independent Film Channel Indie Screams promo at IFC.com

External links
 The Missionary Position on Facebook
The Missionary Position on Spotify
 Post Stardom Depression on Spotify
Walking Papers on Spotify
 Walking Papers Official Website

American male singer-songwriters
Living people
1973 births
Musicians from Tacoma, Washington
Singers from Tacoma, Washington
21st-century American male singers
21st-century American singers
Singer-songwriters from Washington (state)